This is a list of all roster changes that occurred prior to the 2016 Indian Super League season.

Retained players

Atlético de Kolkata

Foreign players

Indian players

Chennaiyin

Foreign players

Indian players

Delhi Dynamos

Foreign players

Indian players

Goa

Foreign players

Indian players

Kerala Blasters

Foreign players

Indian players

Mumbai City

Foreign players

Indian players

NorthEast United

Foreign players

Indian players

Pune City

Foreign players
To be announced

Indian players

Player movement and other transactions

References

Roster
Lists of Indian Super League transfers
India
2016–17 in Indian football